The 1995–96 Campionato Sammarinese di Calcio season was the 11th season since its establishment. It was contested by 10 teams, and A.C. Libertas won the championship.

Regular season

Results

Championship playoff

First round
S.S. San Giovanni 0-1 A.C. Libertas
S.S. Murata 2-4 S.P. La Fiorita

Second round
S.S. San Giovanni 2-0 S.S. Murata
A.C. Libertas 2-2 (pen  4-3 ) S.P. La Fiorita

Third round
A.C. Libertas 3-0 S.S. San Giovanni
S.S. Cosmos 1-0 S.P. La Fiorita

Semifinal
A.C. Libertas 4-3 S.P. La Fiorita

Final
A.C. Libertas 4-1 S.S. Cosmos

References
San Marino - List of final tables (RSSSF)

Campionato Sammarinese di Calcio
San Marino
1995–96 in San Marino football